If Looks Could Kill is the first and only studio album by avant-garde jazz musician Jim French, released in 1979 by Headhunter Records. It is one of composer Diamanda Galás' earliest musical recordings.

Reception

Eugene Chadbourne of AllMusic was highly critical of If Looks Could Kill, describing it as disappointing overall and that "little of this music is developed or delivered with any amount of feeling." He gave the album two out of five stars, concluding that it might only be interesting for completists to seek out.

Track listing

Personnel 
Adapted from the If Looks Could Kill liner notes.

Musicians
 Jim French – soprano saxophone, sopranino saxophone, pan flute, pibcorn, electronics
 Diamanda Galás – vocals (B1–B6)
 Henry Kaiser – electric guitar (B1–B6), production, engineering

Production and additional personnel
 Phil Brown – mastering
 Rolf Erickson – engineering
 Dan Kyle – engineering
 Kent Strother – photography

Release history

References

External links 
 If Looks Could Kill at Discogs (list of releases)

1979 debut albums
Diamanda Galás albums
Henry Kaiser (musician) albums
Albums produced by Henry Kaiser (musician)
Metalanguage Records albums